State Road 4 (SR 4) is a  two-lane state highway in Escambia, Santa Rosa, and Okaloosa counties in the western corner of the Florida Panhandle. It is signed east–west, but the road is slightly diagonal. The road runs from Century near the Alabama state line at an intersection with U.S. Highway 29 (US 29), to the farming community of Milligan at an intersection with US 90.

The road cuts through the Blackwater River State Forest. It crosses the Escambia River, West Fork Big Coldwater Creek, Juniper Creek, Manning Creek, East Fork Big Coldwater Creek, Cedar Creek, Beaver Creek, the Blackwater River, and Penny Creek, all part of the Blackwater River basin (except for the Escambia River).

Route description
SR 4 heads slightly southeast from its western terminus at US 29 and SR 95 in Century in Escambia County, just south of the border with Alabama, and crosses the Escambia River into Santa Rosa County less than  into its journey.  The road then turns and runs east into Jay, where it intersects with SR 89.  SR 4 continues east, then gradually turns southeast to its intersection with SR 87, before turning mostly east again and running through Blackwater River State Park.

Shortly before reaching the eastern edge of the state park, formed by the Blackwater River, the road crosses into Okaloosa County and turns southeast again to its intersection with SR 189 in Baker, where it briefly turns sharply south.  Curving back to the southeast, the road finds its eastern terminus at US 90/SR 10 in Milligan, just southwest of Crestview.

The Florida Department of Transportation annual average daily traffic (AADT) numbers for 2012 show an average of 4,300 vehicles on the Escambia County portion of the road and into Santa Rosa County to Jay, decreasing sharply to 2,600 and then 1,300 vehicles as the road approached its intersection with SR 87.  From SR 87 into Okaloosa County the averages increase slightly again to 1,600 per day, and then rise sharply to a high of 7,900 vehicles as SR 4 approaches its eastern terminus from SR 189 to US 90/SR 10.

History
A 1922 map of Florida auto trails shows an auto trail running from McDavid, south of Century, through Munson, a few miles west of the Okaloosa County line, and then to Baker and Milligan.  It appears that the portion of today's SR 4 from Munson (starting at mile 25.932) to its eastern terminus corresponds to this 1922 auto trail.

In 1935, the current routing of SR 4, from Century in Escambia County into Santa Rosa County, then from Jay through Berrydale to Munson, and east into Okaloosa County, was signed as SR 62, and labeled as a third-class road, which indicates a pavement type of just above a trail, but below bituminous surface conditions.  In Okaloosa County, SR 62 runs into Baker as  third-class road, but the final stretch from Barker To Milligan had already been improved to a second-class surface.

By 1955, SR 4 is being shown as a bituminous road with its start at the intersection with SR 97 west of Century, traveling east, then sharing a concurrency with US 29 heading north through Century, and then heading southeast on today's routing into and through Santa Rosa County.  This path west of Century corresponds to today's County Road 4.  By 1960, the Okaloosa portion of SR 4 was also bituminous, and the routing of SR 4 extended on what is today known as County Road 4, or Antioch Road, south from Milligan to its terminus on SR 85 south of Crestview.  Only about half of this extension was bituminous, to just north of what became I-10, while the southeastern portion of the road was graded and drained, but not surfaced.

On maps from 1977 and 1978, the routing of SR 4 west of Century had been re-signed as County Road 4, while the current routing of SR 4 from its western terminus into and through Santa Rosa County had been paved in hard surface.  By 1985, the extension of SR 4 south of Milligan had also been re-signed as County Road 4.

Major intersections

Related routes

Escambia County

County Road 4 is a county extension of SR 4 in Escambia County that runs from SR 97 east of Walnut Hill to US 29 in Century. North of the eastern terminus, it runs along a hidden concurrency with US 29 to the western terminus of State Road 4.

County Road 4A

County Road 4A is a suffixed alternate county road that begins west of Century in northeastern Escambia County. The road begins as an extension of Byrneville Road north of CR 4, and curves to the right where it replaces County Road 168 as the route for State Line Road, as it enters Century. A spur of the road runs southeast towards US 29/SR 4 at the intersection of Front Street.

Okaloosa County

County Road 4 is an extension of SR 4 in Okaloosa County known as Antioch Road. It spans from a secret overlap with US 90/SR 4 east of Milligan southeast toward State Road 85 in southern Crestview, Florida.

County Road 4A

County Road 4A is a suffixed alternate county road north of Baker in northwestern Okaloosa County of the U.S. state of Florida. It spans east from SR 4 to SR 189, where it then becomes a local street name Holloway Road.

County Road 4B

County Road 4B or Charlie Day Road is another suffixed alternate county road, except this one is south of Baker. The road runs from CR 189 east to SR 4.

References

External links

004
004
004
004
004
004
1945 establishments in Florida